{{Infobox award
| name         =  The 2022 Nobel Prize in Physiology or Medicine
| awarded_for  = 
| presenter    = Nobel Assembly at Karolinska Institutet
| year         = 1901
| website      = 
| holder_label = 2022 laureate
| holder       = Svante Pääbo
| image        = Professor Svante Paabo ForMemRS (cropped).jpg
| caption      = "for his research in the field of genomes of extinct hominins and human evolution"
| host         = Thomas Perlmann
| date         = 
| location     = Stockholm
| country      = Sweden
| reward       = 9 million SEK (2017)
| year2        = 
| network      = 
| runtime      = 
| ratings      = 
| previous     = 2021
| main         = Nobel Prize in Physiology or Medicine
| next         = 2023
}}
The 2022 Nobel Prize in Physiology or Medicine was awarded to the Swedish geneticist Svante Pääbo (born 1955)"for his research in the field of genomes of extinct hominins and human evolution". It was announced by Thomas Perlmann, secretary of the Nobel Assembly at Karolinska Institutet in Stockholm, Sweden, on 3 October 2022.

Laureate

Svante Pääbo was born 1955 in Stockholm, Sweden. He completed his doctoral studies at Uppsala University in 1986, served as a postdoctoral associate at the University of Zürich and University of California, Berkeley in the United States, and joined the faculty at the University of Munich in Germany in 1990. He established the Leipzig, Germany-based Max Planck Institute for Evolutionary Anthropology in 1999, where he continues to be involved. He is also an adjunct professor at the Japan's Okinawa Institute of Science and Technology. He was the recipient of numerous prizes including Gruber Prize in Genetics in 2013, Breakthrough Prize in Life Sciences in 2016, and the Princess of Asturias Award in 2018. 

Nobel Committee
The committee members are elected for a period of three years. In assessing the qualifications of the candidates, the committee is assisted by specially appointed expert advisers. The following medical experts were the members of the 2022 Nobel Committee: 
 Nils-Göran Larsson, professor of mitochondrial genetics; chair
 Thomas Perlmann, professor of molecular development biology; secretary
 Olle Kämpe, professor of endocrinology
 Gunilla Karlsson-Hedestam, professor of immunology
 Sten Linnarsson, professor of molecular systems biology
 Per Svenningsson, professor of neurology

Key publications
The following publications were the fundamental researches that motivated the Nobel Assembly at Karolinska Institutet to award the 2022 Prize to Pääbo:

 Krings M, Stone A, Schmitz RW, Krainitzki H, Stoneking M, Pääbo S. Neandertal DNA sequences and the origin of modern humans. Cell. 1997:90:19-30.
 Green RE, Krause J, Briggs AW, Maricic T, Stenzel U, Kircher M, Patterson N, Li H, Zhai W, Fritz MH, Hansen NF, Durand EY, Malaspinas AS, Jensen JD, Marques-Bonet T, Alkan C, Prüfer K, Meyer M, Burbano HA, Good JM, Schultz R, Aximu-Petri A, Butthof A, Höber B, Höffner B, Siegemund M, Weihmann A, Nusbaum C, Lander ES, Russ C, Novod N, Affourtit J, Egholm M, Verna C, Rudan P, Brajkovic D, Kucan Ž, Gušic I, Doronichev VB, Golovanova LV, Lalueza-Fox C, de la Rasilla M, Fortea J, Rosas A, Schmitz RW, Johnson PLF, Eichler EE, Falush D, Birney E, Mullikin JC, Slatkin M, Nielsen R, Kelso J, Lachmann M, Reich D, Pääbo S. A draft sequence of the Neandertal genome. Science. 2010:328:710-722.
 Krause J, Fu Q, Good JM, Viola B, Shunkov MV, Derevianko AP, Pääbo S. The complete mitochondrial DNA genome of an unknown hominin from southern Siberia. Nature. 2010:464:894-897.
 Reich D, Green RE, Kircher M, Krause J, Patterson N, Durand EY, Viola B, Briggs AW, Stenzel U, Johnson PL, Maricic T, Good JM, Marques-Bonet T, Alkan C, Fu Q, Mallick S, Li H, Meyer M, Eichler EE, Stoneking M, Richards M, Talamo S, Shunkov MV, Derevianko AP, Hublin JJ, Kelso J, Slatkin M, Pääbo S. Genetic history of an archaic hominin group from Denisova Cave in Siberia. Nature. 2010:468:1053-1060.
 Meyer M, Kircher M, Gansauge MT, Li H, Racimo F, Mallick S, Schraiber JG, Jay F, Prüfer K, de Filippo C, Sudmant PH, Alkan C, Fu Q, Do R, Rohland N, Tandon A, Siebauer M, Green RE, Bryc K, Briggs AW, Stenzel U, Dabney J, Shendure J, Kitzman J, Hammer MF, Shunkov MV, Derevianko AP, Patterson N, Andrés AM, Eichler EE, Slatkin M, Reich D, Kelso J, Pääbo S. A high-coverage genome sequence from an archaic Denisovan individual. Science. 2012:338:222-226.
 Prüfer K, Racimo F, Patterson N, Jay F, Sankararaman S, Sawyer S, Heinze A, Renaud G, Sudmant PH, de Filippo C, Li H, Mallick S, Dannemann M, Fu Q, Kircher M, Kuhlwilm M, Lachmann M, Meyer M, Ongyerth M, Siebauer M, Theunert C, Tandon A, Moorjani P, Pickrell J, Mullikin JC, Vohr SH, Green RE, Hellmann I, Johnson PL, Blanche H, Cann H, Kitzman JO, Shendure J, Eichler EE, Lein ES, Bakken TE, Golovanova LV, Doronichev VB, Shunkov MV, Derevianko AP, Viola B, Slatkin M, Reich D, Kelso J, Pääbo S'''. The complete genome sequence of a Neanderthal from the Altai Mountains''. Nature. 2014:505: 43-49.

References

External links
Official website of the Nobel Foundation

2022
Nobel Physiology or Medicine